Manring is a surname. Notable people with the surname include:

Charles Manring (born 1929), American rower
Michael Manring (born 1960), American bass guitarist

See also
Mannering